State Highway 39, abbreviated as SH-39, is a state highway in the U.S. state of Oklahoma. It runs east–west through the central part of the state, beginning at unincorporated Tabler, east of Chickasha, and ending east of Konawa. Along the way, SH-39 serves the counties of Grady, McClain, Cleveland, Pottawatomie, and Seminole. It currently has no lettered spurs.

SH-39 was built in 1923 but not added to the state highway system until approximately 1936. Originally connecting Tabler to Purcell, SH-39 was extended to the east over the next five years, first to Asher and then to Konawa.

Route description

The highway begins at the concurrency of U.S. Highway 62 (US-62)/US-277/State Highway 9 (SH-9) near the unincorporated community of Tabler, east of Chickasha. The road begins traveling east from there, intersecting SH-76  later west of Dibble. From Dibble, it continues east, meeting the eastern terminus of SH-59 and intersecting SH-24 in the unincorporated town of Woody Chapel. It then continues east to Purcell.

In Purcell, SH-39 passes under Interstate 35, but does not have a junction with it. The highway soon encounters US-77/SH-74 just east of the interstate. Here, it turns northward and begins an overlap with the two highways through Purcell. SH-74 splits off after a few blocks while SH-39 and US-77 turn eastward and cross over the Canadian River on the James C. Nance Memorial Bridge. After crossing the river, the highways arrive in the town of Lexington and US-77 splits off to the northeast.

SH-39 continues eastward, serving the Lexington prison and overlapping for less than a mile with SH-102. In the town of Asher, the highway intersects SH-3W and SH-59 again.  later, the highway meets SH-9A in Konawa. The mainline of the highway becomes SH-56.

History
The road that would become SH-39 was built in 1923, but it was not assigned a state route number until at least late 1936, first appearing on the 1937 state map. Originally, the route's eastern terminus was at US-77 in Purcell. By April 1939, it had been extended eastward to end at Asher. The route first reached its current termini in 1941 (although at the time, SH-99 passed through Konawa). A short gap existed west of Asher in the SH-39 designation between 1946 and 1947; by 1948 this gap had been filled. The final change to SH-39 occurred in 1968 or 1969, when SH-99 was rerouted to bypass Konawa, and SH-39 was extended east of town to end at the present junction. No changes have been made since.

Spurs
SH-39 once had one spur route, SH-39B. It ran along what is now May Avenue from SH-39's junction with SH-59 to SH-74B east of Cole, Oklahoma.

Junction list

References

External links

SH-39 on OKHighways.com
SH-39 on Roadklahoma

039
Transportation in Grady County, Oklahoma
Transportation in McClain County, Oklahoma
Transportation in Cleveland County, Oklahoma
Transportation in Pottawatomie County, Oklahoma
Transportation in Seminole County, Oklahoma